The 1961–62 Michigan Tech Huskies men's ice hockey team represented Michigan Tech University in college ice hockey. In its 6th year under head coach John MacInnes the team compiled a 29–3–0 record and reached the NCAA tournament for the third time in its history. The Pioneers defeated Clarkson 7–1 in the championship game at the Utica Memorial Auditorium in Utica, New York.

Season
After barely losing to Denver in the 1960 championship game, Michigan Tech took a step back in 1960–61, barely finishing above .500 and being embarrassed by the Pioneers in the WCHA tournament. The start of the 1961–62 campaign didn't fare much better as the Huskies dropped both games at Michigan, with each sophomore goaltender losing their first career start. The team then had to head home to welcome the defending national champions but, fortunately for MTU, Denver had lost many players to graduation over the summer and weren't nearly as strong. They were still good enough to put up 7 goals in the first game against Tech but the Huskies were able to post 8 of their own and get their first win of the season. That victory seemed to settle Michigan Tech because in the following game they were able to handle the Pioneers and win in a much more convincing fashion, 8–2.

Michigan Tech would host Toronto before the winter break then head to Colorado for a tough series against Denver and Colorado College where they would play 4 games in 5 days. Tech opened with two wins at CC (who would finish the season without a single victory) and after a comfortable 8–4 win in the first game at Denver they scratched out a 5–4 win in overtime to build their record to 8–2. Tech had a short three day break that allowed them to head home where they would host first-place Michigan. The Huskies handed UM their first loss of the season with 4–2 victory and just when it looked like Tech could pull into the lead, the Wolverines returned the favor with their own 4–2 win in the second game. This not only dropped MTU to 7-3 in the conference but, with no further games against the powerful Wolverines, MTU would need help to finish atop the WCHA.

With little time to lick their wounds, the Huskies hit the road and played series against Minnesota and North Dakota. After taking both games against the Golden Gophers they played a pair of nail-biters in Grand Forks, winning the first game 2–1 and escaping with a second win after a 3–2 finish in overtime. Tech started a long home stand by hosting a relatively poor Minnesota–Duluth squad before welcoming North Dakota, Michigan State and Minnesota in consecutive weeks. The Huskies miraculously swept all four weekends and with Michigan having lost twice to Denver in early February, MTU held onto first place and finished with a 17-3 record to earn their first conference championship.

Even through they had won the WCHA Michigan Tech still had games to play on their schedule and after spending a weekend in Duluth winning two more games against the Bulldogs, Tech played host to the Finnish National Team and won a further two games to push their record to 25–3, setting a new program record for wins.

As a result of the NCAA having placed both WCHA teams in the same semifinal the year before (due to Denver and Minnesota not having played one another prior to the NCAA tournament) the WCHA changed their playoff format where they dispensed with the pair of two-game series to declare co-champions and went with a more traditional 4-team single-elimination format where a single champion would be crowned. Additionally, rather than play the games at the home cite of the higher-seeded school, all games would be played at a host venue with the Weinberg Coliseum chosen for the 1962 tournament. The Huskies opened against Michigan State and took the game against the Spartans 5–1 which sent them to a fifth meeting with Michigan, the only team that had been able to defeat MTU all season. Michigan opened the scoring just before the half-way point of the first and added a second goal just over two minutes later, both power play goals. As thing were beginning to look bleak for the Huskies their own power play finally scored with less than 30 seconds left in the period and team captain Jerry Sullivan tied the score with 1 second remaining. Tech could have used the timely goals to jump on the Wolverines in the second but Dave Butts held them off the scoresheet and allowed the WCHA leading scorer and player of the year Red Berenson to give Michigan its second lead of the night with UM's third power play marker. With little to lose Tech came out firing in the third and scored two goals in 17 seconds at the start of the period to take their first lead. Michigan tied the game at 4-all with under 9 minutes to play but Lou Angotti got the game-winner 72 seconds later and Garry Bauman held the fort to earn the Huskies the first solitary WCHA tournament championship. The six goals scored by Michigan Tech were the most allowed by Michigan all season.

Michigan Tech received the top western seed due to their conference championship and opened against ECAC champion St. Lawrence who were making their fourth consecutive tournament appearance and 7th overall but had yet to win a single game against any western school. St. Lawrence opened the scoring with a power play goal in the 11th minute but from then-on it was all Michigan Tech. Don Hermanson scored a pair of goals on the man-advantage and was followed by four more from different teammates while the Huskies outshot the Larries 55–15 and easily marched to their third championship game.

It had thought that MTU could meet Michigan for a sixth time in the championship game but the Wolverines had been dispatched by Clarkson in the semifinal and the Golden Knights were all that stood in Tech way for the first national title. The game couldn't have started better for the Huskies when John Ivanitz scored 38 seconds in and added another five minutes later. Sullivan scored before 10 minutes had elapsed in the game and with an early 3-0 lead MTU was off and running. Unlike St. Lawrence, Clarkson didn't wilt under the bright lights and the Golden Knights continued firing the puck, finally scoring in the final minute of the first to cut the lead to 2. Both teams were held scoreless in the second as Bauman and his counterpart Wayne Gibbons held off separate barrages but Clarkson broke down in the third and allowed four more goals, with Ivanitz completing his hat-trick and Sullivan earning his fourth point of the night before Lou Angotti added a pair of insurance markers.

Angotti was named as tournament MOP, becoming the first player to win the award twice and the only one to do so on both the winning and losing team in the national championship. Angotti, along with Ivanitz, Elov Seger and Henry Åkervall were named to the All-Tournament first team while, despite their stellar play, Bauman and Sullivan were named to the second team. John Ivanitz is one of only two players in history to record a hat trick, including the game-winner, and not be named as tournament MOP (as of 2018).

After the season Åkervall, Angotti, Seger and Sullivan were named to the AHCA All-American West Team while Åkervall, Angotti, Bauman and Sullivan found themselves on the All-WCHA First Team. Seger and Gene Rebellato were also named to the WCHA second team while head coach John MacInnes earned his second WCHA Coach of the Year award.

Michigan Tech ended the season on a 20-game winning streak. They would extend that to 22 game at the start of the following season, the longest such streak in program history.

Standings

Schedule

|-
!colspan=12 style=";" | Regular Season

|-
!colspan=12 style=";" | 

|-
!colspan=12 style=";" |

Roster and scoring statistics

Goaltending Statistics

1962 championship game

E1 Clarkson vs. W1 Michigan Tech

References

Denver Pioneers men's ice hockey seasons
Michigan Tech
Michigan Tech
Michigan Tech
Michigan Tech
Michigan Tech
Michigan Tech